Barnby Dun railway station was a small station on the South Yorkshire Railway's line between Doncaster and Thorne. It served the village of Barnby Dun, near Doncaster, South Yorkshire, England. The original line followed closely the canal bank and the station was resited when the line was 'straightened' in the 1860s.

The original station, which was situated across the canal from the village, was opened with the line on 7 July 1856 and closed on 1 October 1866 when the new station, at the opposite side of the village was opened.

The rebuilt station consisted of flanking platforms with its main  buildings, in yellow engineers brick, on the Thorne-bound (up) platform. This platform was long, with a ramp to a barrow crossing to the 'down' side at its centre. The station was again rebuilt to accommodate four tracks in the Doncaster to Thorne widening of 1913 when the Doncaster-bound (down) platform was moved back. The station closed on 4 September 1967. The station building was demolished in July 2008.

References

External links
 Barnby Dun station on navigable 1955 O. S. map

Disused railway stations in Doncaster
Railway stations in Great Britain opened in 1856
Railway stations in Great Britain closed in 1967
Former South Yorkshire Railway stations
Buildings and structures demolished in 2008
Demolished buildings and structures in England